Huju Town is an urban town in Chaling County, Hunan Province, People's Republic of China.

Cityscape
The town is divided into 15 villages and 1 community, the following areas: Huju Community, Shuangyuan Village, Hehu Village, Yinhu Village, Huxi Village, Hefeng Village, Huangping Village, Diche Village, Gaoshui Village, Gaoying Village, Chagan Village, Yingfeng Village, Sanxing Village, Sanda Village, Qiaoxia Village, and Xinhu Village.

References

External links

Divisions of Chaling County